Shafa Baku FK, was an Azerbaijani football club from Baku. They were founded in 1998, and were promoted to the Top League the same year. In 2001 the club won the Azerbaijan Cup, beating Neftchi Baku 2–1 in the final. During the 2001–02 season they played their home games in Buzovna and finished in second place during the regular season. However, they finished bottom of the "Championship ground" round.

The club withdrew from the Top League during the winter break of the 2004–05 season due to financial problems. Their remaining games were awarded to the opposition as 3–0 wins, and the club finished bottom of the table.

Honours

National
 Azerbaijan Cup
 Winners (1): 2000–2001

Domestic league and cup history

European cup history

League Records

Appearances

Goals

Notable players
Had international caps for their respective countries. Players whose name is listed in bold represented their countries while playing for Shafa.
Azerbaijan

  Murad Aghakishiyev
  Tarlan Ahmadov
  Elnur Allahverdiyev
  Ramin Guliyev
  Aftandil Hajiyev
  Zaur Hashimov
  Ramal Huseynov
  Emin Imamaliev
  Fizuli Mammedov
  Ruslan Musayev
  Samir Musayev
  Rashad Sadiqov
  Mahir Shukurov
  Zaur Tagizade

References

Football clubs in Azerbaijan
Defunct football clubs in Azerbaijan
Association football clubs disestablished in 2004
1998 establishments in Azerbaijan
2005 disestablishments in Azerbaijan